is a professional Japanese baseball player. He is an infielder for the Orix Buffaloes of Nippon Professional Baseball (NPB).

References 

2000 births
Living people
Nippon Professional Baseball infielders
Baseball people from Okinawa Prefecture
Orix Buffaloes players